Eggesin is a railway station in the town of Eggesin, Mecklenburg-Vorpommern, Germany. The station lies on the Jatznick–Ueckermünde railway and the train services are operated by Ostseeland Verkehr.

Train services
The station is served by the following service:
regional service (Ostseeland Verkehr) Bützow - Neubrandenburg - Pasewalk - Ueckermünde Stadthafen

References

Railway stations in Mecklenburg-Western Pomerania
Buildings and structures in Vorpommern-Greifswald